Rainer Ernst Burkard (born 28 January 1943, Graz, Austria ) is an Austrian mathematician. His research interests include discrete optimization, graph theory, applied discrete mathematics, and applied number theory.

He earned his Ph.D. from the University of Vienna in 1967 and received his habilitation from the University of Graz in 1971. From 1973-1981 Rainer Burkard was full professor of Applied Mathematics at the University of Cologne (Germany).
Since 1981 Rainer Burkard is full professor with the Graz University of Technology.

Positions held
1984-1986 Vice President of GMÖOR
1986-1988 President of the Austrian Society of Operations Research
1995-1997 EURO Vice President of IFORS
1993-1996 Dean of the Faculty of Science, Graz University of Technology
1994-1998 Member of the Council of the European Consortium of Mathematics in Industry
1991-2000 Member of the Senate of the Christian Doppler Research Society
2001-2002 Vice President of EURO

Awards
Prize of the Austrian Mathematical Society in 1972
The Scientific Prize of the Society of Mathematics, Economics and Operations Research in 1991
 The EURO Gold Medal 1997
 Since 1998 Honorary Member of the Hungarian Academy of Sciences
 Since 2011 Honorary Member of the Austrian Society of Operations Research

Books
 Methoden der ganzzahligen Optimierung, Springer Wien, 1972
 with Ulrich Derigs: Assignment and Matching Problems: Solution Methods with FORTRAN- Programs. Lecture Notes in Economics and Mathematical Systems, Band 184, Berlin-New York: Springer 1980.
 Graph Algorithms in Computer Science. HyperCOSTOC Computer Science, Vol. 36, Hofbauer Publ., Wiener Neustadt, 1989.
 With Mauro Dell' Amico and Silvano Martello: Assignment Problems, SIAM, Philadelphia, 2009.

References

Austrian mathematicians
University of Graz alumni
University of Vienna alumni
Living people
1943 births